Frank William Nolen (born December 26, 1939) is an American politician who served as a member of the Virginia Senate. Winning a 1974 special election to succeed H. Dunlop Dawbarn after his retirement, he lost reelection in 1975 to J. Marshall Coleman. When Coleman resigned to become Attorney General in 1977, Nolen won back his old seat.

As of February 2019, Nolen is the chairman of the Augusta County Democratic Committee.

References

External links
 

1939 births
Living people
Virginia state senators
Virginia Tech alumni